Glide may refer to:
 Gliding flight, to fly without thrust

Computing
Glide API, a 3D graphics interface
Glide OS, a web desktop
Glide (software), an instant video messenger
 Glide (docking), a molecular docking software by Schrödinger

Flight and movement
 A measure used by Innova Discs, to evaluate flying disc performance
 Bacterial gliding, a form of motility in biology

Music
 Glide (album), a 2008 album by Jerry Douglas
 Glide, stage name of guitarist Will Sergeant
 "Glide", a song by the jam band Phish from their 1992 album A Picture of Nectar
 "Glide", a song by Stone Temple Pilots from their album No. 4
 Glide (music synthesis), a musical synthesizer parameter equivalent to portamento

Organizations
 Glide FM, independent local radio station broadcasting from Oxfordshire, United Kingdom
 Glide Memorial Church, San Francisco, California, United States
 Glide Foundation, a charitable foundation of Glide Memorial Church

Products
 Glide (automobile) (1902–1920), manufactured by the Bartholomew Company
 Oral-B Glide, a dental floss that before its acquisition by Procter & Gamble was known simply as "Glide Floss"
 Glide, a Pillow Pal dolphin made by Ty, Inc.

Other uses
 Glide, in linguistics, a synonym for semivowel
 Glide (Martian crater)
 Glide, Oregon, census-designated place in the United States
 Glide High School, Glide, Oregon, United States
 Glide reflection, a geometrical transformation
 USS Glide

See also
 Glider (disambiguation)
 Gliding (disambiguation)
 The Glide (disambiguation)